Year 1331 (MCCCXXXI) was a common year starting on Tuesday (link will display the full calendar) of the Julian calendar.

Events

September–December 
 September 8 – Stefan Dusan declares himself king of Serbia.
 September 27 – Battle of Płowce: The German Teutonic Knights and the Poles battle to a draw.

Date unknown 
 The Sieges of Cividale del Friuli and Alicante begin.
 The Genkō War begins in Japan.
 Ibn Battuta visits Kilwa.
 The first recorded outbreak of the Black Death occurs, in the Chinese province of Hubei.

Births 
 February 16 – Coluccio Salutati, Florentine political leader (d. 1406)
 April 14 – Jeanne-Marie de Maille, French Roman Catholic saint (b. 1414)    
 April 30 – Gaston III, Count of Foix (d. 1391)
 October 4 – James Butler, 2nd Earl of Ormonde (d. 1382)
 date unknown
 Hamidüddin Aksarayî, Ottoman teacher of Islam (d. 1412)
 Blanche d'Évreux, queen consort of France (d. 1398)
 Michael Palaiologos, Byzantine prince
 probable – Salvestro de' Medici, provost of Florence (d. 1388)

Deaths 
 January 14 – Odoric of Pordenone, Italian explorer
 April 17 – Robert de Vere, 6th Earl of Oxford (b. c. 1257)
 May 12 – Engelbert of Admont, abbot of Admont in Styria
 October 27 – Abulfeda, Kurdish Syrian historian and geographer (b. 1273)
 November 11 – Stefan Uroš III Dečanski of Serbia (b. c. 1285)
 December 26 – Philip I, Prince of Taranto, titular Latin Emperor (b. 1278)
 December 30 – Bernard Gui, French inquisitor (b. 1261 or 1262)
 date unknown – Matilda of Hainaut, Princess of Achaea (b. 1293)

References